Vaika islands is a group of islands belonging to the country of Estonia. They lie next to Vilsandi. The Vaika islands are referenced in a book titled Islands of Estonia.

Vaika islands are Alumine Vaika, Karirahu, Keskmine Vaika, Kullipank, Mustpank and Ülemine Vaika.

See also
 List of islands of Estonia

Estonian islands in the Baltic
Saaremaa Parish